John Phillips (born 9 June 1985) is a Welsh Middleweight mixed martial artist. A professional since 2005, he has also competed for BAMMA, Cage Rage, Ultimate Fighting Championship, and Cage Warriors. He is the former BAMMA Middleweight Champion.

Career
Phillips faced Jesse Taylor for the latter's first defense of the Cage Warriors Middleweight on May 4, 2013 on the Cage Warriors 54 card. Phillips lost to Taylor via submission early in the first round.

His next fight came on March 17, 2018 at UFC Fight Night: Werdum vs. Volkov against Charles Byrd, where both fighters made their UFC debut. He lost the fight via a submission due to a rear-naked choke in round three.

Phillips faced Kevin Holland on June 1, 2018 at UFC Fight Night: Blaydes vs. Ngannou 2. Phillips lost the fight via submission late in round three.

Phillips faced fellow Welshman Jack Marshman on March 16, 2019 at UFC on ESPN+ 5 At the weigh-ins, Marshman weighed in at 188 lbs, 2 pounds over the middleweight non-title fight limit of 186 lbs. He was fined 20% of his fight purse and the bout proceeded at catchweight. Phillips lost the bout via split decision.

In his next fight Phillips faced Alen Amedovski at UFC Fight Night: Hermansson vs. Cannonier on September 28, 2019. He won via knockout in 17 seconds of the first round. This was his first win in the UFC and earned him the $50,000 performance of the night bonus.

Phillips was scheduled to face Duško Todorović on March 21, 2020 at UFC Fight Night: Woodley vs. Edwards. Due to the COVID-19 pandemic travel bans, the bout was moved to Cage Warriors 113 but was later on removed from the card due to Todorović's travel restrictions.

Phillips was expected to face Duško Todorović on July 16, 2020 at UFC Fight Night: Kattar vs. Ige. On July 8, Todorović pulled out due to a potential medical issue. He was replaced by promotional newcomer Khamzat Chimaev. Phillips lost the fight via submission in round two.

Phillips faced Jun Yong Park on October 18, 2020 at UFC Fight Night 180. He lost the fight via unanimous decision.

On November 13, 2020, it was announced that Phillips had been released from the UFC.

Championships and accomplishments

Mixed martial arts
Ultimate Fighting Championship
Performance of the Night (One time) vs. Alen Amedovski
 BAMMA 
 BAMMA Middleweight Champion (One time) 
 Rage in the Cage 
 Rage in the Cage Middleweight Tournament Winner (One time)

Mixed martial arts record

|Loss
|align=center|22–11 (1)
|Jun Yong Park
|Decision (unanimous)
|UFC Fight Night: Ortega vs. The Korean Zombie 
|
|align=center|3
|align=center|5:00
|Abu Dhabi, United Arab Emirates
|  
|-
|Loss
|align=center|22–10 (1)
|Khamzat Chimaev
|Submission (D'Arce choke)
|UFC on ESPN: Kattar vs. Ige 
|July 16, 2020
|align=center|2
|align=center|1:12
|Abu Dhabi, United Arab Emirates
|
|-
|  Win
| align=center| 22–9 (1)
| Alen Amedovski
| KO (punches) 
| UFC Fight Night: Hermansson vs. Cannonier
| 
| align=center|1
| align=center|0:17
| Copenhagen, Denmark
| 
|-
| Loss
| align=center| 21–9 (1)
| Jack Marshman
| Decision (split) 
| UFC Fight Night: Till vs. Masvidal
| March 16, 2019
| align=center|3
| align=center|5:00
| London, England
| 
|-
| Loss
| align=center| 21–8 (1)
| Kevin Holland
| Submission (rear-naked choke)  
| UFC Fight Night: Blaydes vs. Ngannou 2
| September 28, 2018
| align=center|3
| align=center|4:05
| Beijing, China
| 
|-
| Loss
| align=center| 21–7 (1)
| Charles Byrd
| Submission (rear-naked choke)  
| UFC Fight Night: Werdum vs. Volkov
| March 17, 2018
| align=center|1
| align=center|3:58
| London, England
| 
|-
| Win
| align=center| 21–6 (1)
| Jose Otavio dos Santos Lacerda
| KO (punch)  
| Budo 16: Round vs. James
| September 24, 2016
| align=center|1
| align=center|4:44
| Swansea, Wales
| 
|-
| Win
| align=center| 20–6 (1)
| Cheick Kone
| TKO (punch)  
| BAMMA 24: Kone vs. Phillips
| February 27, 2016
| align=center|1
| align=center|1:05
| Dublin, Ireland
| 
|-
| Win
| align=center| 19–6 (1)
| Markus Di Gallo
| KO (punch)  
| Fightstar Promotions: Rage in the Cage 3
| March 21, 2015
| align=center|1
| align=center|N/A
| Paisley, Scotland
| | 
|-
| Win
| align=center| 18–6 (1)
| Charlie Ward
| KO (punch)  
| Fightstar Promotions: Rage in the Cage 3
| March 21, 2015
| align=center|2
| align=center|N/A
| Paisley, Scotland
| 
|-
| Loss
| align=center| 17–6 (1)
| Jesse Taylor
| Submission (guillotine choke) 
| Cage Warriors Fighting Championship 54
| May 4, 2013
| align=center|1
| align=center|1:23
| Cardiff, Wales
| 
|-
| Win
| align=center| 17–5 (1)
| Chris Fields
| Submission (guillotine choke) 
| Cage Warriors Fighting Championship 48
| July 21, 2012
| align=center|2
| align=center|2:04
| London, England
| 
|-
| Win
| align=center| 16–5 (1)
| Tomas Penz
| Submission (triangle choke)  
| Cage Warriors Fight Night 6
| May 24, 2012
| align=center|2
| align=center|3:21
| Isa Town, Bahrain
| 
|-
| Loss
| align=center| 15–5 (1)
| Pavel Kusch
| Submission (heel hook)  
| Cage Warriors Fight Night 5
| April 12, 2012
| align=center|1
| align=center|0:25
| Amman, Jordan
| 
|-
| Win
| align=center| 15–4 (1)
| Matt Ewin
| TKO (injury)  
| KnuckleUp MMA 8
| October 29, 2011
| align=center|1
| align=center|0:56
| Kingston upon Hull, England
| 
|-
| Loss
| align=center| 14–4 (1)
| Frank Trigg
| TKO (doctor stoppage)   
| BAMMA 6: Watson vs. Rua
| May 21, 2011
| align=center|1
| align=center|2:41
| London, England
| 
|-
| Win
| align=center| 14–3 (1)
| James Zikic
| TKO (punches)   
| BAMMA 4: Reid vs. Watson
| September 25, 2010
| align=center|1
| align=center|1:34
| Birmingham, England
| 
|-
| Win
| align=center| 13–3 (1)
| Johnny Gillan
| TKO (punches)   
| Fight UK 1
| May 2, 2010
| align=center|1
| align=center|1:37
| Leicester, England
| 
|-
| Win
| align=center| 12–3 (1)
| Marius Liaukevicius
| TKO (punches)   
| Celtic Fight Night 3
| March 6, 2010
| align=center|1
| align=center|0:15
| Brecon, Wales
| 
|-
| Win
| align=center| 11–3 (1)
| Danny Welsh
| TKO (punches to the body)   
| Trojan MMA: Trojan Warfare
| February 27, 2010
| align=center|1
| align=center|0:36
| Exeter, Wales
| 
|-
| Win
| align=center| 10–3 (1)
| Matt Thorpe
| TKO (punches)   
| KnuckleUp MMA 4: Origins
| February 20, 2010
| align=center|1
| align=center|0:50
| Cheltenham, Wales
| 
|-
| Loss
| align=center| 9–3 (1)
| Denniston Sutherland
| TKO (submission to punches)   
| BAMMA 1: The Fighting Premiership
| June 27, 2009
| align=center|1
| align=center|3:32
| London, England
| 
|-
| Win
| align=center| 9–2 (1)
| Bohumil Lungrik
| TKO (punches)   
| WFC 8: D-Day
| April 18, 2009
| align=center|1
| align=center|3:15
| Ljubljana, Slovenia
| 
|-
| Win
| align=center| 8–2 (1)
| Tommy Gunn
| TKO (punches)   
| Predator Fight Night
| November 9, 2008
| align=center|1
| align=center|0:44
| Swansea, Wales
| 
|-
| Win
| align=center| 7–2 (1)
| Jake Bostwick
| TKO (submission to punches)   
| Cage Rage 28: VIP
| November 9, 2008
| align=center|2
| align=center|2:47
| London, England
| 
|-
| Loss
| align=center| 6–2 (1)
| Tom Watson
|  Decision (Unanimous)  
| Cage Rage 27: Step Up
| July 12, 2008
| align=center|3
| align=center|5:00
| London, England
| 
|-
| NC
| align=center| 6–1 (1)
| Jake Bostwick
| No Contest  
| Cage Rage 25: Bring It On
| March 8, 2008
| align=center|1
| align=center|4:10
| London, England
| 
|-
| Win
| align=center| 6–1
| Christos Petroutsos
| TKO (N/A)   
| Cage Rage Contenders: Wales
| November 18, 2007
| align=center|1
| align=center|N/A
| Swansea, Wales
| 
|-
| Win
| align=center| 5–1
| Mihaly Dobrai
| KO (N/A)   
| MedVid: Anno Domini 1
| June 9, 2007
| align=center|N/A
| align=center|N/A
| Pula, Croatia
| 
|-
| Win
| align=center| 4–1
| Mario Valentic
| TKO (N/A)   
| MedVid: Anno Domini 2
| January 27, 2007
| align=center|N/A
| align=center|N/A
| Pula, Croatia
| 
|-
| Win
| align=center| 3–1
| Edgaras Pilvinis
| TKO (referee stoppage) 
| Cage Gladiators 3
| December 3, 2006
| align=center|1
| align=center|0:34
| Liverpool, England
| 
|-
| Win
| align=center| 2–1
| Gary Savage
| TKO (punches) 
| HOP 7: Cage Fever
| November 26, 2006
| align=center|1
| align=center|1:23
| Swansea, Wales
| 
|-
| Loss
| align=center| 1–1
| Jim Wallhead
| TKO (elbows) 
| HOP 5: Fight Night 5
| April 9, 2006
| align=center|1
| align=center|1:41
| Swansea, Wales
| 
|-
| Win
| align=center| 1–0
| Nigel Whitear
| KO (N/A) 
| HOP 3: Next Generation
| July 24, 2005
| align=center|1
| align=center|0:57
| Swansea, Wales
| 
|-

See also
 List of male mixed martial artists

References

External links
 
 

1985 births
Living people
Welsh male mixed martial artists
Middleweight mixed martial artists
Sportspeople from Swansea
Ultimate Fighting Championship male fighters